"Celebrate" is a song recorded by South Korean girl group Twice. It was released by Warner Music Japan on July 15, 2022, as a digital single from their fourth Japanese studio album of the same name (2022).

Composition 
"Celebrate" was composed by Woo Min Lee "collapsedone", Justin Reinstein, Like (MRCH), Jjean, with lyrics written by J. Y. Park "The Asiansoul", all members of Twice and Co-sho. Running for 3 minutes and 8 seconds, the song is composed in the key of G major with a tempo of 112 beats per minute.

Music video 
In July 2022, two teasers for the music video of "Celebrate" were released. On July 15, 2022, the music video was published on YouTube.

Live performances 
On July 22, 2022, Twice performed "Celebrate" on Music Station.

Commercial performance
On the week of July 20, 2022, "Celebrate" debuted at number fifty-eight of the Billboard Japan Hot 100. It rose to number twelve on the week of July 27, 2022. The song eventually peaked at number-ten the following week of August 3, 2022.

In South Korea, the song debuted on Circle Download Chart at number one-hundred seventy-four, on the week of July 24, 2022 to July 30, 2022.

Track listing
Digital download / streaming
"Celebrate" – 3:08

Personnel
Credits adapted from Melon.

 Twice – lyricist, vocals
 J. Y. Park "The Asiansoul" – lyricist
 Co-sho – lyricist
 Woo Min Lee "collapsedone" – arrangement, composer
 Justin Reinstein – arrangement, composer
 Like (MRCH) – composer
 Jjean – composer

Charts

Certifications 

! scope="col" colspan="3" | Streaming
|-

Release history

References 

2022 singles
2022 songs
Japanese-language songs
Songs written by Park Jin-young
Twice (group) songs